Psiloritis Natural or Nature Park (Greek Φυσικό Πάρκο Ψηλορείτη) is a UNESCO Global geopark located in the central part of the island of Crete, in southern Greece.

History 

Since 2001 the park is member of the European Geoparks Network, which is within the UNESCO Global Geoparks Network. It is a local authorities' initiative, managed by the geopark's management committee under the AKOMM Psiloritis S.A. The Natural History Museum of the University of Crete is the scientific advisor of the park.

Features 

Psiloritis Natural Park extends on the Psiloritis mountain and its northern foothills till the Cretan Sea. It has an area of 1159 km2. Administratively the park is split into the Prefectures of Rethymno and Heraklion.  The headquarters of the park are located at the municipality of Anogeia.

The park aims to conserve natural and cultural heritage of Psiloritis area through promotional and educational activities, as well as sustainable development initiatives like geotourism, ecotourism and agrotourism. Due to its geological features many universities across the world organise field trips for their students to visit the park. Among the geological protected features of the park there are many caves, included the Idaean Cave. The caves, as well as other relevant features of the park, are connected to the Karstic nature of the Mount Ida massif.

See also

Notes

Citations

External links

 Psiloritis Natural Park

Global Geoparks Network members
Protected areas of Greece
Geography of Crete
Tourist attractions in Crete
Geoparks in Greece